Nephelolychnis velata is a moth in the family Crambidae. It was described by Edward Meyrick in 1933. It is found in the Democratic Republic of the Congo.

References

Moths described in 1933
Pyraustinae
Taxa named by Edward Meyrick